Anisophyllea rhomboidea is a species of plant in the Anisophylleaceae family. It is found in Indonesia and Malaysia.

References

rhomboidea
Vulnerable plants
Taxonomy articles created by Polbot
Taxa named by Henri Ernest Baillon